Super Deck! is an out-of-print super hero collectible card game designed by Marc Miller and produced by Card Sharks in 1994.

Publication history
It was the fourth CCG ever made, preceded by Magic: the Gathering, Spellfire, and Jyhad.  Gameplay involved two players, each playing on one side of hero vs. villain.  Artwork was colored pencil/inkwork, and the characters were not properties of any major comic book company.  Some of the artists included Brian Michael Bendis, Dean Haspiel, Phil Hester, Frances Mao, and Josh Neufeld.

It had one expansion called Slim Decks that was released in June 1995. This expansion had 160 cards sold in packs of 30. Ten percent of packs had one of two bonus cards, each redeemable for one of four more powerful cards that could not be obtained any other way.

Description
The original set was 160 cards in size, sold in starter decks with 60 cards and a rulebook, and in 10-card booster packs.

In a product release article in InQuest, the game was described as suitable for those who "need an easy introduction to card games".

Reviews
White Wolf Inphobia #53 (March, 1995)

Further reading
Preview in Scrye #1

References

Card games introduced in 1994
Collectible card games based on comics